The Azad Brigade or the 3rd Guerrilla Regiment was a unit of the Indian National Army that formed a part of the First INA and later part of the 1st Division after the INA's revival under Subhas Chandra Bose.

After the revival of the INA in February 1943, the 3rd Guerrilla Regiment came under the command of Col. Gulzara Singh and consisted of three infantry battalions.

It was one of the units that participated in the INA's disastrous Imphal Campaign, arriving in upper Burma immediately before the withdrawal began, protecting and supporting the Japanese forces withdrawing from the Indo-Burma border through the Kabaw Valley. It later came under the command of Shah Nawaz Khan in 1944.

References
Fay, Peter W. (1993), The Forgotten Army: India's Armed Struggle for Independence, 1942-1945. Ann Arbor, University of Michigan Press., 

South-East Asian theatre of World War II
Military units and formations of the Indian National Army